Yuxarı Şilyan (also, Yukhary-Shil’yan and Yukh-Shil’yan) is a village and municipality in the Ujar Rayon of Azerbaijan.  It has a population of 4,263.

References 

Populated places in Ujar District